Katharina von Georgien is a drama written by baroque writer Andreas Gryphius about Queen Ketevan the Martyr of Georgia. It was published in 1657.

Synopsis
The queen Ketewan dies for her faith. She was loved by Shah Abbas.

Main characters
 Ketevan, queen of Georgia
 Shah Abbas, shah of Persia
 Iman Culi
 Seinel Can
 Salome

References 

1657 plays
German plays